In Ohio, State Route 36 may refer to:
U.S. Route 36 in Ohio, the only Ohio highway numbered 36 since about 1932
Ohio State Route 36 (1923), now SR 585 (Wooster to Akron), SR 59 (Akron to Ravenna), and SR 5 (Ravenna to Pennsylvania)

36